USS Frigate Bird is a name used more than once by the U.S. Navy:

 , served in a non-commissioned status in the 13th Naval District between 30 January 1941 and 27 April 1943
 , was launched 24 October 1953 by Quincy Adams Yacht Yard, Quincy, Massachusetts

United States Navy ship names